Shonphi Dashain Higher Secondary School, commonly known as Sonphi Dashain High School Shreepur, is a public high school in Aurahi Municipality, ward no. 3, in Mahottari District of Nepal. It is one of the schools designated for technical education in collaboration with Council for Technical Education and Vocational Training (CTEVT), under which it runs Diploma in Civil Engineering programme. New buildings for the technical school and a library were unveiled by the State Minister of Health Surendra Yadav.

References

Schools in Nepal
Buildings and structures in Mahottari District